Anolis luciae, also known commonly as the St. Lucia anole or Saint Lucian anole, is a species of anole lizard in the family Dactyloidae. The species is endemic to Saint Lucia, an island-nation in the Caribbean Lesser Antilles.

Etymology
The specific name, luciae, refers to the island of Saint Lucia.

Geographic range
A. luciae is widespread on Saint Lucia and its offshore islets.

Description
The coloration and markings of A. luciae vary.  Its dorsal ground color ranges from brown in drier habitats to bright green in wetter areas.  Some populations have blue coloration on the sides, and the ventral surface may be white or yellowish.  The area around the eye may be white, blue, or green.  Males may be patternless or have reticulations or chevron patterns on the dorsal surface.  Females are duller than males, and may have a mid-dorsal stripe or dark chevron markings.

Reproduction
A. luciae is oviparous.

Invasive species
A. luciae co-exists on Saint Lucia with two introduced anole species: A. extremus and A. wattsi.  A. luciae appears to be resisting competition, and the two invasive species are restricted to areas around the capital, Castries.

See also
List of Anolis lizards

References

Further reading
Garman S (1887). "On West Indian Reptiles. Iguanidæ". Bulletin of the Essex Institute 19: 25–50. (Anolis luciæ, new species, pp. 44–46).
Schwartz A, Henderson RW (1991). Amphibians and Reptiles of the West Indies: Descriptions, Distributions, and Natural History. Gainesville, Florida: University of Florida Press. 720 pp. . (Anolis luciae, p. 292).
Schwartz A, Thomas R (1975). A Check-list of West Indian Amphibians and Reptiles. Carnegie Museum of Natural History Special publication No. 1. Pittsburgh, Pennsylvania: Carnegie Museum of Natural History. 216 pp. (Anolis luciae, pp. 89–90).

Anoles
Lizards of the Caribbean
Reptiles of Saint Lucia
Endemic fauna of Saint Lucia
Reptiles described in 1887
Taxa named by Samuel Garman